MaltaPost p.l.c. is the postal service company in Malta. The public limited company took over the postal services previously carried out by Posta Limited, and started operating on 1 May 1998.

History
MaltaPost p.l.c. was registered with the Malta Registry of Companies as a public limited company on 16 April 1998. It took over from Posta Limited on 1 May of that year. On 31 January 2002, MaltaPost was partially privatized when the government sold 35% to Transcend Worldwide Ltd, a subsidiary company of New Zealand Post Ltd. In September 2007 the government sold 25% of its shareholding in MaltaPost to Lombard Bank plc, which effectively became the majority shareholder in the company with 60% shareholding. The other 40% were sold to the public in January 2008.

In 2011 MaltaPost carried out a series of reforms, including adopting a new logo.

MaltaPost inaugurated the Malta Postal Museum in June 2016.

Stamps

MaltaPost issued its first stamps on 27 May 1998, and the issue consisted of a set of 4 commemorating the International Year of the Ocean. Less than a year after MaltaPost took over, in early 1999, the German company Bundesdruckerei began printing Maltese stamps instead of the local company Printex Limited. MaltaPost's first definitive was issued between 1999 and 2003, and it showed Maltese flowers. In 2004, Printex began printing Maltese stamps once again. Since then, the number of sets per year has increased and photography began to be used more often on stamps, especially in 2008–2009. Many recent issues are based on paintings or photos or graphic designs designed by MaltaPost itself. Many stamps are based on local topics, and English is the predominant language on stamps. MaltaPost takes part in various stamp issuing programmes including EUROPA and SEPAC.

Since 2022 there have been a lot of sets with high values when standard local postage is €0.37.

Outlets

Postal hubs
There are 4 hubs in Malta and 1 in Gozo, each locality in Malta and Gozo is under one of these hubs.

Post offices
A code starting with "R" indicates a Branch Post Office (BPO), and one with "S" indicates a Sub Post Office (SPO). The latter are usually located in shops such as stationers. Currently (September 2015) MaltaPost operates 35 BPOs (including 5 in Gozo) and 28 SPOs (including 3 in Gozo).

Other
There are an additional 431 authorized stamp vendors in Malta and Gozo. Letterboxes are also found in practically every locality.

Postal codes

MaltaPost initially continued to use postal codes as they were in the 1990s. In 2007 they changed the postcodes of all addresses in the Maltese Islands. Each code consist of three letters, that differ by locality, and four numbers, for example MTP 1001 (the postcode of MaltaPost's main complex in Marsa).

See also

 Postage stamps and postal history of Malta

References

External links
 Official website
 Philatelic Bureau

Communications in Malta
Companies of Malta
Members of the Small European Postal Administration Cooperation
Philately of Malta
Transport companies established in 1998
Postal system of Malta
Postal organizations
Companies listed on the Malta Stock Exchange
1998 establishments in Malta